Linda Rampell, born 5 December 1971, in Stockholm, Sweden, is a Swedish design theorist, critic, lecturer and author. She holds a PhD at Lund University. In her PhD thesis she deconstructs the modernist discourse of nationalist design in Sweden. In her postdoctoral research project Homo Capitalistes, she concludes that "the only ism after postmodernism is consumerism", and that the postmodern condition has become a shopmodern condition, in which aesthetics and economics have merged into aesthetonomics, which defines an economy of seeing evaluating how much a being is worth. Rampell is a member of International Association of Art Critics (AICA) and has written articles, essays and books on the subject design theory.

Bibliography
 Vera von Toth: En skönhetskirurgs monolog (2019). Vera von Toth: A Beauty Surgeon’s Monologue (written in Swedish). Gabor Palotai Design / A+O Publishing. 
 The Shopmodern Condition (2016). Gabor Palotai Design / Art & Theory Publishing. 
 Designatlas. En resa genom designteori 1845–2002 (2013). Gabor Palotai Publisher. Summary in English: Atlas of Design: A Journey Through Design Theory pp. 679–695.  
 Freud med skalpell. Modekropp prêt-à-suppôter Homo Kapitalismus II (2008). Gabor Palotai Publisher.  
 Designdarwinismen™ Homo Kapitalismus I (2007). Gabor Palotai Publisher. 
 CODE Manifest (2003). Co-written with Lars O Ericsson. Gabor Palotai Publisher. 
 Designatlas. En resa genom designteori 1845–2002 (2003). Gabor Palotai Publisher. Summary in English: Atlas of Design: A Journey Through Design Theory pp. 761–781). 
 A Critical Investigation of the Modernist Project of Design in Sweden (2002). Dissertation written in Swedish with a summary in English, Department of Arts and Cultural Sciences, Division of Art History and Visual Studies, Lund University
 ZOO (2000). Gabor Palotai Publisher (2000).

Selection of Essays in English
 Universal Design: Megalomania and Hypocrisy, pp. 18–21, Design Matters Vol. 7 2004, published by Danish Design Centre.
 The Myth of Swedish and Scandinavian Design, pp. 48–51, Design Matters Vol 3 2003, published by Danish Design Centre.
 Andrea Branzi: ’Out with the Blonde and Perfect Design!’, pp. 70–75, Design Matters, Vol 4 2004 published by Danish Design Centre.
 Towards a Fashion Diagnosis, The Nordic Textile Journal, Vol. 1 2010, published by The Swedish School of Textiles, University of Borås.
 Foreword/text in Cosmos by Gábor Palotai (2019). Gabor Palotai Publisher. 
 Foreword/text in Zoo by Gábor Palotai (2017). Gabor Palotai Publisher. 
 Foreword in Odysseus. A graphic Design Novel by Gábor Palotai (2007). Gabor Palotai Publisher. 
 Foreword in Gábor Palotai: 111 Posters (2007). Gestalten Verlag.

Notes

1971 births
Living people
Swedish non-fiction writers
Swedish women non-fiction writers
Swedish fiction writers
Lund University alumni
Critical theorists